Canute Guild or Guilde de Saint-Canut was a guild in Tallinn, Estonia. The guild was named after Knud Lavard.

The guild was probably established in 13th century. The first mentioning was in 1326. At the beginning, the guild was composed by artisans and merchants. After creation of Great Guild (circa 14th century), the merchants moved to the Great Guild.

By nationality, most of the guild's members were German. For Estonians, becoming a guild's member was restricted, especially between 1508 and 1698.

The guild was closed in 1920.

References

Organizations based in Tallinn
History of Tallinn
Guilds